Standard Singaporean Mandarin is the standard form of Singaporean Mandarin. It is used in all official Chinese media, including all television programs on Channel 8 and Channel U, various radio stations, as well as in Chinese lessons in all Singapore government schools. The written form of Chinese used in Singapore is also based on this standard. Standard Singaporean Mandarin is also the register of Mandarin used by the Chinese elites of Singapore and is easily distinguishable from the Colloquial Singaporean Mandarin spoken by the general populace.
 
In terms of phonology, vocabulary and grammar, Standard Singaporean Mandarin is similar to Putonghua (Standard Chinese in the People's Republic of China). Minor discrepancies appear in different vocabulary usage.

History

Mandarin (the standard language of China based on northern dialects) has been used as a lingua franca in Singapore alongside Hokkien (a south-eastern Chinese topolect) since the end of the Second World War. Before the standardisation of Singaporean Mandarin in the year 1979, Mandarin was largely used in a colloquial form based on the speech of Beijing, with infusions from various southern non-Mandarin Chinese varieties such as Hokkien, Teochew, Cantonese, Hainanese and Hakka. This colloquial form of Mandarin served as a bridge between speakers of various mutually unintelligible southern varieties. Mandarin was also the language of instruction in the now defunct Chinese-medium schools and education system. The use of Mandarin in the Chinese-medium schools led its use mainly by the Chinese-educated or Chinese elites in Singapore.

After Prime Minister Lee Kuan Yew announced and kickstarted the Speak Mandarin Campaign in 1979, the Promote Mandarin Council started research on Mandarin standardisation based on case studies in Mainland China and Taiwan.

Differences between standard and colloquial forms

Major differences between Standard Singaporean Mandarin and Colloquial Singaporean Mandarin lie in their linguistic features. Standard Singaporean Mandarin uses standard Mandarin vocabulary and grammar which are very similar to that of the Beijing standard (Putonghua), both spoken and written. Colloquial Singaporean Mandarin, though based on Standard Mandarin, is often mixed with loan words and syntax from other Chinese varieties (especially those in southern China), and to a lesser extent, Malay and English. This is due to the multilingual nature of Singaporean families and society. There are also often cases when Singaporeans (due to their poorer command of Mandarin) find it hard to find or recall a Mandarin term and thus use loan words from other languages instead.

The term "rojak" (a Malay food used for describing "mixture") is most appropriate in describing colloquial Singaporean Mandarin. Colloquial Singaporean Mandarin is the equivalent of Singlish in the Mandarin speaking world of Singapore. The word "Singdarin" has been used to name the Colloquial Singaporean Mandarin.

Standard Singaporean Mandarin also differs from colloquial Singaporean Mandarin in terms of vocabulary, grammar and pronunciation. This is because not all Singaporean Chinese speak Mandarin at home. Some could speak other Non-Mandarin Chinese varieties or English most of the time and have less exposure to Standard Mandarin. All these factors have influenced the way in which colloquial Singaporean Mandarin is formed.

Colloquial Singaporean Mandarin uses a variety of Southern Chinese exclamatory particles, in lieu of standard Mandarin equivalents. An example is the loan exclamatory final particle 囉 (lor) from Cantonese (analogous to Singlish usage), instead of the Mandarin exclamatory final particle 嘛/呀/啊 (ma/ya/a):

   ！(standard)
   ！(colloquial)
"That's what I'm saying!"

Another example is the use of the Cantonese expression "做咩" (zou me):

？ (standard)
 ？ (colloquial)
"Why?" / "Doing what?"

The exclamatory final particle 咧 (leh) from Hokkien is used in colloquial Singaporean Mandarin:
   ！ (standard)

     ！ (colloquial)
"It's not like this!"

Another phrase found in colloquial Mandarin is derived from the Hokkien expression siáⁿ-mih lâi ê (啥物來的):

  ？ (standard)
  ？ (colloquial)
"What is this?"

Standard Singaporean Mandarin uses pure Mandarin words. Colloquial Singaporean Mandarin, on the other hand, uses loan words from other languages. The English loan word "then" is commonly used in place of Mandarin word 才 in colloquial Singaporean Mandarin. Again, a loan exclamatory final particle 囉 (lor) from Cantonese is used instead of Mandarin exclamatory final particle 啊/呀 (a/ya). The English loanword then is also often used to replace the Mandarin word 然后 (ránhòu) in colloquial Singaporean Mandarin:

       ！ (standard)
    then   ！ (colloquial)
"It is only due to the fact that I did not do my homework that I was scolded."

Differences from other forms of Standard Mandarin

Phonology differences

Minor differences occur between the phonology (particularly the tones) of Standard Singaporean Mandarin and other forms of Standard Mandarin.

Lexicon differences

There are differences in the use of different lexicon (vocabulary) in Standard Singaporean Mandarin as compared to other forms of Standard Mandarin. Standard Singaporean Mandarin has its own unique proprietary vocabulary, which differs from Standard Mandarin used in Mainland China and Taiwan. This is due to a different political, cultural and linguistic environment in Singapore. The Dictionary of Contemporary Singaporean Mandarin Vocabulary 《时代新加坡特有词语词典》 edited by Wang Huidi (汪惠迪) listed 1560 uniquely local Singaporean Mandarin words, which are not used in Mainland China or Taiwan.

Ever since the 1980s, Standard Singaporean Mandarin has been inclining itself more towards Standard Mainland Mandarin. As such, lexicon similarity between Standard Singaporean Mandarin and Standard Mainland Mandarin has reached almost 90%.

While the majority of vocabulary is shared by Standard Mandarin throughout East Asia, there are a few significant differences in choice of words. For instance, "pineapple" is 黄梨 (huánglí) in Singapore (from Hokkien 王梨 ông-lâi), but 菠蘿/菠萝 (bōluó) in Mainland China and 鳳梨 (fènglí) in Taiwan.

The examples below illustrate some differences in the lexicon used in Singapore, Mainland China and Taiwan:

我想吃快熟面。 (Singapore)
我想吃方便面。 (Mainland China)
我想吃速食麵。 (Taiwan)
"I wish to eat instant noodles."

我要搭德士 。 (Singapore)
我要搭出租车 。 (Mainland China)
我要搭計程車。 (Taiwan)
"I want to take a taxi."

在部署突击行动时，最重要的是要确保公众及相关单位内任何人士的安全。 (Singapore)
在部署突擊行動時，最重要的是要確保公眾及相關單位內所有人士的安全。 (Taiwan)
在部署突击行动时，最重要的是要确保公众以及有关单位内所有人士的安全。 (Mainland China)
"In deploying the raid, the most important thing is to ensure the safety of anyone in the public and associated units."

See also
Singaporean Mandarin
Singdarin
Malaysian Mandarin
Standard Chinese

Notes

References
漢典 (Handian Dictionary)
教育部重編國語辭典修訂本 (Dictionary of Mandarin from Ministry of Education, R.O.C.)

Mandarin Chinese
Chinese languages in Singapore